French Republics refer to a succession of republics after the proclamation of the French Revolution and the abolition of the monarchy in France in 1792. They are raised when there is a change of the constitution or a situation where the country had restored its monarch (Like the First and Second French Republic). 

There have been five republics in the history of France:
 French First Republic (1792–1804)
 French Second Republic (1848–1852)
 French Third Republic (1870–1940)
 French Fourth Republic (1946–1958)
 French Fifth Republic (1958–present)